Rothechtaid or Roitheachtaigh may refer to:

Rothechtaid mac Main, son of Maen, son of Óengus Olmucaid, according to medieval Irish legend and historical tradition, High King of Ireland
Rothechtaid Rotha, son of Róán, son of Failbe, son of Cas Cétchaingnech, son of Faildergdóit, apparently king of the eastern midland kingdom of the Gailenga and High King of Ireland